Olimje is a settlement in the Municipality of Podčetrtek in eastern Slovenia. The area around Podčetrtek was traditionally part of the region of Styria. It is now included in the Savinja Statistical Region.

History
Olimje was created as a settlement in 1995 through the merger of the former settlements of Slake and Sopote.

Castle
Olimje Castle is a 16th-century castle located in the settlement. In the 17th century, when it was converted to a monastery, the monastic church dedicated to the Assumption of Mary was built. It is now also the local parish church. A second church in the settlement is dedicated to Saint Andrew and is a Late Gothic single nave building dating to the 15th century.

Gallery

References

External links
Olimje on Geopedia

Populated places in the Municipality of Podčetrtek